James Ford (Lawrence, Massachusetts March 21, 1903 – San Diego  February 13, 1977) was an American actor in silent and sound films.

Selected filmography
Outcast (1928), directed by William Seiter
Naughty Baby (1928)
 Wizard of the Saddle (1928)
Prisoners (1929)
Making the Grade (1929)
House of Horror (1929)
Children of the Ritz (1929)

References

20th-century American male actors
1903 births
1977 deaths